Provaci ancora prof! (English: Try again teacher!) is an Italian television series.

Plot
The show follows the story of Camilla Baudino, a high school teacher that often finds herself involved in some crimes. Camilla, an amateur detective, collaborates with policemen to resolve these cases and in the meantime she takes care of her husband and daughter.

Main characters
 Camilla Baudino (seasons 1-7), starring Veronica Pivetti.Inquisitive and stubborn literature teacher in the technical school Fibonacci in Rome first (seasons 1-4), in the Nelson Mandela Institute in Turin then (seasons 5-6) and in a night class for adults also in Turin finally (season 7). She is Renzo's wife and Livietta's mother. She collaborates with the commissioner Gaetano Berardi, whom she is strongly attracted to, every time a crime somehow concerning her occurs; after the arrival of the commissioner Paolo Matteis, she continues to collaborate with the police secretly, thanks to Torre and Marchese. During season 4, she separates from Renzo and starts a relationship with Mario Visconti, but in the end she gets back together with her husband. During season 5, she moves to Turin, where she finds again the commissioner Berardi and the inspector Torre. During season 6, she breaks up with Renzo a second time, after finding out he cheated on her with Carmen and got his lover pregnant; she then gets engaged with the commissioner Berardi. During the last episodes of season 7, she moves to Naples, where Gaetano has been relocated.
 Renzo Ferrero (seasons 1-7), starring Enzo Decaro.Good hearted and sarcastic architect, he is Camilla's husband and Livietta's father. He is not happy at all with Camilla collaborating with the police in relation to murders, as he mainly fears that his wife could get into troubles or risky situations. He is also suspicious of Gaetano, whom he often considers Camilla's lover. During season 2, he is strongly attracted to Pamela, his daughter's dance teacher, a feeling which ends with the woman flying to New York. During season 4, he separates from Camilla and starts a relationship with his young colleague Carmen; however, when Carmen tells him they must move to America to keep working together, he understands how much he loves his family and eventually comes back to his wife. During season 6, he has a one-night stand with Carmen in Venice and gets her pregnant with Lorenzo, also called Renzito. After he breaks up with Camilla, he longs for coming back to his wife again, despite the latter has got engaged with Gaetano.
 Gaetano Berardi (seasons 1-3, 5-7), starring Paolo Conticini.Charming and kind police commissioner, he manages the investigations Camilla gets involved in. He has a relationship with the gallerist Bettina during season 1, with the prosecutor Sonia De Giorgis during season 2 and with Roberta, whom he nearly marries with, during season 3. He and Camilla are clearly attracted to each other, but he tries to forget the teacher in the end of season 3. During season 4, he never appears as he is said to have got married and become quaestor in Sondrio. During season 5, he comes back in Camilla's life and, during season 6, he succeeds in engaging with her, taking advantage of her marital crisis. Since then, he is very jealous of Renzo, acknowledging the latter is still in love with Camilla, and annoyed of the chaotic family life the teacher lives. In the last episode of season 7, he gets another displacement and starts living with Camilla in Naples.
 Pasquale Torre (seasons 1-7), starring Pino Ammendola.Nice neapolitan detective, he is Berardi's and De Matteis' friend, as well as Camilla's informant. During season 5, he moves to Turin following Berardi's displacement. Although he does not like Turin's weather and lifestyle, he finally settles in and engages with his colleague Luciana, who becomes his wife during season 6 and whom he is preatty jealous of.
 Livia "Livietta" Ferrero (seasons 1-7) , starring Ludovica Gargari.Intelligent and clever Renzo and Camilla's daughter, she has a very good relationship with her parents. She is friend with Giulio, son of her mother's colleague Martina Predolin, and Nino, Berardi's nephew. During season 4, when she is 13, she has a crush on her dance mate Diego. During season 5, she lives some teenage issues with her parents, especially due to their move to Turin; in spite of that, she finds love, first in a boy charged with murder and later in a shy classmate. During season 6, she falls in love with George, a boy from London met during a study holiday, who becomes her husband and father of her daughter, named Camilla (nicknamed Cami) after the teacher. During season 7, she find out that George cheated on her, so she comes back to Turin with Cami and starts attending the faculty of architecture; she then starts a short relationship with Stefano Busi, one of her father's clients, who then turns out to be a womanizer; she finally gets back to George in London and decides to continue her studies in England.
 Marco De Matteis/Visconti (season 4), starring Cesare Bocci.Handsome and charming wine estate entrepreneur, he is the commissioner Paolo de Matteis' brother. His surname used to be "De Matteis", but he later adopted his mother's surname "Visconti". He starts a relationship with Camilla, whom he proposes to, but in the end the teacher breaks up with him to get back to her husband.
 Paolo De Matteis (season 4), starring Flavio Montrucchio.Painstaking and obsessive commissioner, he is Marco Visconti's brother. He dislikes Camilla, whose interference in police investigations he does not tolerate. He lives in his brother's house, despite Marco advises him to find his own home.

Locations 
Seasons 1-4 are set in Rome mainly. Seasons 5-7 are set both in Rome and Turin.

Social themes 
 Divorce
 Drug addiction
 Illegal immigration
 Compulsive gambling
 'Ndrangheta
 Murder
 Prostitution
 Kidnapping
 Ultras 
 Usury
 Violence against women

Episodes

Season 1 (2005)

Season 2 (2007)

Season 3 (2008)

Season 4 (2012)

Season 5 (2013)

Season 6 (2015) 
The series was renewed for a sixth season of 8 episodes and will air in 2015.

Season 7 (2017) 
The series was renewed for a seventh season of 8 episodes and will air in 2017.

See also
List of Italian television series

References

External links
 

Italian television series
RAI original programming